Mark Chay Jung Jun (simplified Chinese: 蔡荣俊; born 18 February 1982) is a Singaporean freestyle swimmer who has represented the Republic in, amongst others, the SEA Games and Summer Olympics. His international swimming career began at the 1997 SEA Games, and stretched all the way till the 2005 SEA Games. In between, he has competed in a total of five SEA Games, two Asian Games, two Commonwealth Games and two Olympics.

He has been awarded "Singapore Sportsboy of the Year" in 2000, and Sportsman of the Year in 2001. Chay competed and studied at Brigham Young University in Provo, Utah. He was the Mountain West Conference Champion. Chay graduated from Brigham Young University with a degree in Communications: Communications studies emphasis. Chay retired from swimming in July 2007.

Political career
On 14 January 2021, Chay was chosen as one of the 9 Nominated Members of Parliament (NMP) for the 14th Parliament of Singapore, which began on 21 January 2021. After his appointment was announced, Chay said that he intends to speak on sports as an agent of social change and a way to unify a nation, prompted by the impact of the COVID-19 pandemic on Singapore's sports scene. In addition, Chay plans to speak on economic issues too.

References

External links
 
 
 
 

1982 births
Living people
Singaporean male freestyle swimmers
Anglo-Chinese School alumni
Asian Games competitors for Singapore
BYU Cougars men's swimmers
Commonwealth Games competitors for Singapore
Competitors at the 1997 Southeast Asian Games
Olympic swimmers of Singapore
Singaporean Nominated Members of Parliament
Singaporean people of Chinese descent
Southeast Asian Games bronze medalists for Singapore
Southeast Asian Games gold medalists for Singapore
Southeast Asian Games medalists in swimming
Southeast Asian Games silver medalists for Singapore
Swimmers at the 1998 Asian Games
Swimmers at the 1998 Commonwealth Games
Swimmers at the 2000 Summer Olympics
Swimmers at the 2002 Asian Games
Swimmers at the 2002 Commonwealth Games
Swimmers at the 2004 Summer Olympics
21st-century Singaporean people